Medicago marina is a plant species of the genus Medicago. It is native to the Mediterranean basin but is found worldwide. It forms a symbiotic relationship with the bacterium Sinorhizobium meliloti, which is capable of nitrogen fixation. Common names include coastal medick and sea medick.

External links 
 International Legume Database & Information Services

marina
Plants described in 1753
Taxa named by Carl Linnaeus
Flora of Lebanon and Syria
Flora of Malta